Wroclavia is a shopping, entertainment, and office center, located in Wrocław, Poland, at the Huby housing estate (1 Sucha Street), on former Pond Fields in the immediate vicinity of the Wrocław Główny railway station, integrated with the Wrocław main bus station (Dworzec Wrocław) located at -2 level of the gallery.

Wrocław Bus Terminal
It is the second location and third building of the main bus station in the city since the 1960s.

Until 1994, the bus station was located at 3 May Constitution Square, where the Silver Tower Center currently stands. Construction of the new station began in 1974, south of the main train station, in the place of a park. The new building on Sucha Street was commissioned in 1994, and after eight years construction of the office building began on the old site. 

In the area of the station in Sucha Street, Wroclavia shopping center was built; at that time the station was moved to a temporary building in Joannitów Street. In 2014, the station on Sucha Street was demolished and the construction of the shopping center began, while at the same time, the bus station was moved to a temporary place in the area, in the courtyard of the Railway Directorate on Joannitów Street. The mall was opened in October 2017, and the new station was opened several days later. 

The temporary station, which is still used by some carriers, has not been closed down.

Shopping center
There are about 200 shops, restaurants, cafés, service points, as well as a Cinema City cinema with 20 rooms (including IMAX, 4DX, and 3 VIP rooms), a 24-hour fitness club, a children's playroom, etc.

The center is owned by Unibail-Rodamco-Westfield.

External links 
 
 Wroclavia
 Wrocław main bus station
  Centrum handlowe Wroclavia na str. polska-org.pl

References

Transport in Wrocław
Bus stations in Poland
Westfield Group
Shopping malls in Poland
2017 establishments in Poland